The pool stage of the 2004–05 Heineken Cup.

Pool 1

Pool 2

Pool 3

Pool 4

Pool 5

Pool 6

Seeding and runners-up

See also

2004-05 Heineken Cup

External links

Pool Stage
Heineken Cup pool stages